Alumex PLC is an aluminium extrusions manufacturing company in Sri Lanka. The company was incorporated as a South Korean-Sri Lankan joint venture in 1986. The company commenced commercial operations two years later. The Sri Lankan partners acquired the South Korean partner's stake partners in 2006. Sri Lankan conglomerate Hayleys acquired Alumex in 2010 and was listed on the Colombo Stock Exchange after an initial public offering in 2014. Alumex is the leading aluminium manufacturer in Sri Lanka, with a market share of 46%. Alumex is one of the LMD 100 companies in Sri Lanka.

History
The company was incorporated in 1986 as Alumex (Pvt) Ltd, a South Korean-Sri Lankan joint venture. The company commenced operations with a five-inch extruder and an anodizing plant in 1988. Stanley William, who was a founding director of Sampath Bank, was the company's first chairman. In 2000, a seven-inch extruder plant set up in the Makola facility. It is the largest extruder in Sri Lanka. The Sri Lankan partners of the joint venture took control of the South Korean stake in 2006. Hayleys acquired 95% of the stake in Alumex for LKR2.2 billion in 2010. Up until then, Hayleys focused on manufacturing for the overseas market, it was the first time Hayleys acquired a manufacturing company mainly focused on the domestic market. However, Fitch Ratings placed Hayleys on rating watch negative with AA-(lka) rating due to the acquisition being funded by debt facilities.

Alumex (Pvt) Ltd was re-registered as a public company called Alumex Limited in 2013. In March 2014, Alumex announced an initial public offering worth LKR839 million. It was the tenth Hayley's subsidiary to be listed on the Colombo Stock Exchange. In 2018, the company launched a new plant in Ekala built at a cost of LKR2 billion. The plant is fully automated and has an output of 1,000 MT per month.

Operations
Alumex is the leading Aluminium manufacturer in Sri Lanka, with a 46% market share. Alumex's related company Swisstek controls 30% of the market share. Alumex is one of the LMD 100 companies in Sri Lanka. LMD 100, analogous to Fortune 500, lists publicly traded companies in Sri Lanka by revenue. In its 2020/21 edition, Alumex ranked 88th. Alumex won the gold award at the 29th annual National Chamber of Exporters Awards in 2022. The company invested LKR1 billion to increase the capacity in the Sapugaskanda facility. Alumex obtains 50% of its raw materials from recycled aluminium beverage cans.

See also
 List of companies listed on the Colombo Stock Exchange

References

External links
 Official website

1986 establishments in Sri Lanka
Manufacturing companies established in 1986
Companies listed on the Colombo Stock Exchange
Manufacturing companies of Sri Lanka
Building materials companies